Paul E. Hoffman is an Internet pioneer, based in Santa Cruz, California.
Hoffman has been involved with the Internet Engineering Task Force (IETF) since the early 1990s, and has chaired numerous IETF working groups. He was the founder of the Internet Mail Consortium and the Virtual Private Network Consortium. He is currently a technologist at ICANN.

Writer
He has authored popular books on technical topics, including Perl for Dummies and Netscape Communicator for Dummies.

RFCs
He is the author of the following Requests for Comments (RFCs):

See also
 List of RFCs

References

Living people
Writers from California
People from Santa Cruz, California
Year of birth missing (living people)